Glenshaw is a census-designated place within Shaler, Hampton, Indiana, O'Hara and Ross townships in Allegheny County, Pennsylvania, United States. As of the 2020 census, it had a population of 8,945.

Demographics

References

Census-designated places in Allegheny County, Pennsylvania
Census-designated places in Pennsylvania